Youri Ziffzer (born 21 August 1986) is a German professional ice hockey goaltender who is currently an unrestricted free agent who most recently played for Adler Mannheim in the Deutsche Eishockey Liga (DEL). He previously played three seasons with Kölner Haie before signing as a free agent with Mannheim on May 2, 2014.

References

External links

1986 births
Living people
German ice hockey goaltenders
Adler Mannheim players
Eisbären Berlin players
Hamburg Freezers players
Hannover Scorpions players
Kölner Haie players